Andrés García de Quiñones (1709–1784) was a Spanish architect of the Baroque period, active in Salamanca.

Works
In Salamanca
Finished the Main square and built the city hall.
Jesuit seminary of La Clerecia, now the Pontificia university, including:
The Towers and the bell-gable. 
Patio de los estudios (cloister) 
Main staircase and the school's Great Hall (Theological Hall).
Retables of the Visitation and of St. James.

In Betanzos: The General archive of Galicia. Once finished the building was used as a barracks and is now the town hall.

Sources
 

18th-century Spanish architects
Spanish Baroque architects
1709 births
1784 deaths